Madhavi Pattanayak (or Madhavi Dasi, 16th-century CE) was one of the earliest female poets to write in the Odia language. She was a disciple of Sri Chaitanya and a contemporary of the famous Pancha Sakha poets in the late fifteenth and early sixteenth centuries.

Early life and family
Madhavi Pattayanak was born to a Karana family in Bentapura, a village of the Puri district. After becoming a widow at a young age, Pattayanak began to live with her cousin Raya Ramananda, who was the governor of Rajmahendri. During this period, Pattayanak, Ramananda, and Pattayanak's brother Sikhi Mohanty all became followers of Sri Chaitanya.

Literary works
Pattayanak was devoted to the god Jagannath. She wrote religious poetry in the mid-16th century.

References

Hindu poets
Poets from Odisha
16th-century Indian poets
Odia-language poets
Indian women poets

Odissi music composers